The Bishop of Dudley is an episcopal title used by a suffragan bishop of the Church of England Diocese of Worcester, in the Province of Canterbury, England. The title takes its name after the town of Dudley in the West Midlands; the See was erected under the Suffragans Nomination Act 1888 by Order in Council dated 24 October 1973. From 1 October 1993 until 2002, the bishop was an area bishop for the diocese's Black Country parishes.

List of bishops

References

External links
 Crockford's Clerical Directory - Listings

Dudley
 
Anglican Diocese of Worcester